Media Buzz (stylized #mediabuzz) is an hour-long news media criticism program hosted by Howard Kurtz. The show airs live on Sunday mornings at 11:00 AM and generally discusses politics and pop culture issues from a moderate perspective.

The show replaces the similarly themed Fox News Watch, the last edition of which aired on August 31, 2013. Media Buzz aired in competition with CNN's Reliable Sources with Brian Stelter which also started in 2013. Reliable Sources with Brian Stelter was cancelled in August 2022.  Media Buzz surpassed one million viewers in late 2013.

Host
Howard Kurtz: (2013–present) Kurtz, who is the founding host of the show, joined the network in 2013 after departing CNN where he served as host of the now canceled Reliable Sources from 1998 until he was replaced by Brian Stelter. He serves as Fox News' Chief Media Analyst in addition to hosting the weekly show. Kurtz is also the author of five books, including "Media Circus," "Reality Show" and the New York Times bestseller "Spin Cycle."

Frequent Panelists
The show leads off every week with it's signature "Spin Cycle" segment where two or three panelists of diverse backgrounds debate the political issues of the week. Below are frequent panelists of the segment.

Ben Domenech: Fox News Contributor, editor at large of The Spectator
Guy Benson: host of The Guy Benson Radio Show
Leslie Marshall, Fox News Contributor, radio host
Kat Timpf: co-host of Gutfeld!, Fox News Analyst 
Will Cain: co-host of Fox & Friends Weekend
Mara Liasson: NPR correspondent
Charles Hurt: The Washington Times columnist, Fox News Contributor  
Kevin Corke: Fox News Anchor
Liz Claman: host of The Claman Countdown on Fox Business
Harold Ford Jr.:  co-host of The Five and former Tennessee Congressman (D)
Laura Fink: Rebelle Communications CEO
Gianno Caldwell: Fox News Political Analyst
Robby Soave: Reason senior editor 
Mollie Hemingway: senior editor of The Federalist
Geraldo Rivera: co-host of The Five
Steve Krakauer: Author 
Susan Ferrechio: Politics Correspondent for The Washington Times
Jason Chaffetz: Fox News Contributor, Former Utah Congressman (R)
Richard Fowler: Fox News Contributor, radio host
Kellyanne Conway: Fox News Contributor, Former Senior Council to President Donald Trump

References

External links
 

2013 American television series debuts
2010s American television news shows
2020s American television news shows
Fox News original programming
Criticism of journalism
English-language television shows